Barbara Anna Nowacka (born 10 May 1975) is a Polish politician. A left activist in Labour United, and later in Your Movement, in October 2015 she became leader of the United Left coalition for the 2015 Polish parliamentary election, bringing together Labour United, Your Movement, the Democratic Left Alliance, the Greens, and the Polish Socialist Party. Nowacka is the daughter of the late Deputy Prime Minister and Minister of Social Policy Izabela Jaruga-Nowacka. Since 2016 she has been the leader of the Polish Initiative.

Biography
Born in Warsaw, the daughter of Jerzy Nowacki, a rector at the Polish-Japanese Academy of Information Technology, and Izabela Jaruga-Nowacka, a former Deputy Prime Minister and Minister of Social Policy under Marek Belka's Cabinet. Her mother was listed on the flight manifest of the Tupolev Tu-154 of the 36th Special Aviation Regiment carrying the President of Poland Lech Kaczyński which crashed near Smolensk-North airport near Pechersk near Smolensk, Russia, on 10 April 2010, killing all aboard.

Nowacka was educated at the University of Warsaw, where she was active as a feminist in the Federation for Women and Family Planning. From 1997 to 2006, she was a member of the youth wing of Labour United and then of the party itself. In 2014 she stood unsuccessfully in the European elections in Lublin for Europa Plus, supported by Aleksander Kwaśniewski. She went on from that defeat to join Janusz Palikot's Your Movement, becoming a joint leader, and helped to create the United Left, a broad coalition. On 4 October 2015 she was named as its candidate for prime minister if it won the election, and on 17 October she presented the coalition's programme at a conference in Katowice. However, in the elections on 25 October the United Left failed to reach the 8 per cent threshold for obtaining parliamentary representation under Poland's system of election, while Nowacka herself failed to be elected in the Warsaw I parliamentary constituency.

The Polish elections of 2015 were unusual in that most of the major parties contesting them were led by women. While Nowacka was the leader of the United Left, Ewa Kopacz of the governing Civic Platform party was the incumbent prime minister, and Beata Szydło of the opposition Law and Justice party was the main challenger. In the event, Szydło was elected with an overall majority.

In 2016, Foreign Policy magazine included Nowacka, together with Agnieszka Dziemianowicz-Bąk of Razem, on its annual list of the 100 most influential global thinkers for their role in organizing protests against a total ban on abortion in Poland.

In June 2019, Nowacka became leader of the political party Polish Initiative (iPL), which she originally founded as an association in 2016. She is currently standing for election in Constituency № 26 (Słupsk) as a candidate for the Civic Coalition, of which iPL is a member party.

Nowacka has been fiercely critical of the influence that the Catholic church has in Polish politics. When in October 2020 the Polish parliament considered placing stricter enforcement on abortion, Nowacka claimed that the Catholic bishops of Poland, the majority of whom strongly support such legislation, had "blood on their hands". She later attended a protest against the new abortion restrictions, where she was tear-gassed by a police officer after approaching him and showing her ID card.

Notes

External links
  

1975 births
Politicians from Warsaw
University of Warsaw alumni
Living people
Your Movement politicians
Labour Union (Poland) politicians
21st-century Polish politicians
21st-century Polish women politicians
Members of the Polish Sejm 2019–2023
Women members of the Sejm of the Republic of Poland
Polish socialist feminists
Polish Initiative
Civic Coalition (Poland)
Polish abortion-rights activists
Critics of the Catholic Church